The 1985 Bucknell Bison football team was an American football team that represented Bucknell University during the 1985 NCAA Division I-AA football season.

In their eleventh and final year under head coach Bob Curtis, the Bison compiled a 3–7 record. Will McFarland and Joe Shupp were the team captains.

This would be Bucknell's final year as an independent, before joining the Colonial League. Future league opponents on Bucknell's 1985 schedule included Davidson, Lafayette and Lehigh. The league was later renamed Patriot League, and continues to be the Bisons' home conference as of 2020.

Bucknell played its home games at Memorial Stadium on the university campus in Lewisburg, Pennsylvania.

Schedule

References

Bucknell
Bucknell Bison football seasons
Bucknell Bison football